Naja nigricincta is a species of spitting cobra in the genus Naja, belonging to the family Elapidae. The species is native to the deserts and drier regions of southern Africa. The species is largely nocturnal, and is often found while crossing roads at night. There are two recognized subspecies.

Taxonomy
Naja nigricincta had long been considered to be a subspecies of the black-necked spitting cobra (Naja nigricollis), but morphological and genetic differences have led to its recognition as a separate species.

Subspecies
Two subspecies are currently recognized under Naja nigricincta. The nominate subspecies N. n. nigricincta, commonly known as the zebra spitting cobra, zebra cobra, zebra snake or western barred spitting cobra, is given its name because of the dark crossbars that run the length of the snake's body. The subspecies N. n. woodi, commonly known as the black spitting cobra, woods black spitting cobra, is solid black and is found only in the desert areas of southern Africa.

Description
 Naja nigricincta is an oviparous venomous spitting cobra with dark brown to black body and zebra-like vertical whitish or light yellow stripes along the dorsal side. These stripes are generally evenly spaced and can be complete or fragmented. The ventral scales range from white to orange in color. In juvenile snakes the overall coloration is lighter than in the adults.

Like all other Naja species, this snake can flatten its head and neck into a hood. The head and hood are uniformly dark brown or black.

The venom of Naja nigricincta can cause massive hemorrhaging, necrosis and paralysis in bite victims. These snakes can also spit their venom, hitting their enemies with great accuracy and causing temporary or permanent blindness.

Distribution
This species is native to parts of southern Africa (southern Angola, Namibia, Botswana, Lesotho, and South Africa).

References

Naja
Snakes of Africa
Reptiles of Angola
Reptiles of Botswana
Reptiles of Lesotho
Reptiles of Namibia
Reptiles of South Africa
Taxa named by Charles Mitchill Bogert
Reptiles described in 1940